Mahrızlı or Mahruzlu or Makhryzly or Mekhrizli or Makhrizli may refer to:
Mahrızlı, Agdam, Azerbaijan
Mahruzlu, Qubadli, Azerbaijan